Cilofungin (INN) is the first clinically applied member of the echinocandin family of antifungal drugs. It was derived from a fungus in the genus Aspergillus. It accomplishes this by interfering with an invading fungus' ability to synthesize the cell wall (specifically, it inhibits the synthesis of (1→3)-β-D-glucan).

References 

Abandoned drugs
Antifungals
Echinocandins